Sherri Kay Coale (born January 19, 1965) is a retired college basketball coach. She was the head coach of the University of Oklahoma Sooners women's basketball team for 25 years, from 1996 to 2021. Coale was inducted into the Women's Basketball Hall of Fame in 2016.

Personal
Coale grew up in Healdton, Oklahoma and married Dane Scott Coale (born 1964) on June 20, 1987. The couple has two children, son Colton (born 1992) and daughter Chandler (born 1996).  Coale has one brother, Jack.  Their parents are Beverly Stash and Joe Buben.

Coale completed her undergraduate studies at Oklahoma Christian College in Oklahoma City, where she graduated summa cum laude in 1987.  She played on the school's Lady Eagles basketball team as a guard.

Coale was inducted into the Oklahoma Women's Hall of Fame in 2007.

Coaching career
Coale accepted the Oklahoma position in 1996. She went directly from a high school squad (having coached the previous six years at the local Norman High School) to an NCAA Division I team. Inheriting a team in turmoil at Oklahoma, within four years, Coale had the Sooners back in the NCAA Tournament. She brought the Sooners into the national spotlight in 2002 when her team went all the way to the national championship game, losing to undefeated Connecticut.

In 2005–2006, Coale's Sooners went 16–0 in Big 12 play and became the second Big 12 basketball team, men's or women's, to go undefeated in conference play. The University of Kansas men's basketball team went undefeated in Big 12 play in the 2001–2002 season. In 2009 and 2010, Coale led the Sooners back to the NCAA Tournament Final Four in back-to-back seasons, losing tight games to Louisville and Stanford in the semifinals.

Coale announced her retirement at the conclusion of the 2020-2021 season.

USA Basketball
Coale was named as assistant coach of the USA team which would compete at the Junior World Championship in Brno, Czech Republic during July 2001. The team won their first five games, including a record setting win against Mali. The 97–27 final score represented the largest margin of victory by a USA team in Junior World Championship history. The preliminary round results qualified the team for the medal rounds, where they faced the host team, the Czech Republic. With a home crowd cheering them on, the Czech team held a nine-point lead with just over six minutes to go. The USA team cut the lead down to three points with seconds to go, and good defense gave the ball back to the USA. However, the USA was called for an offensive foul, and lost possession. The Czech Republic team won 92–88, and went on to beat Russia 82–80 to win the gold medal. The USA team beat Australia 77–72 to win the bronze medal. <ref></https://archive.fiba.com/pages/eng/fa/event/p/sid/2901/_/2001_World_Championship_for_Junior_Women/index.html></ref> Diana Taurasi was the leading scorer for the US with 19.3 points per game, while Alana Beard was close behind with 18.0 points per game. Nicole Powell was the leading rebounder for the US, with seven rebounds per game.

Head coaching record

References

External links
 Oklahoma Women’s Hall of Fame Oral History Project – OSU Library
 Official bio

1965 births
Living people
American women's basketball coaches
Basketball coaches from Oklahoma
College women's basketball players in the United States
High school basketball coaches in Oklahoma
Oklahoma Christian Lady Eagles basketball players
Oklahoma Sooners women's basketball coaches
People from Carter County, Oklahoma